Theodor Christian Frølich Bergh known as Totti Bergh (5 December 1935 in Oslo – 4 January 2012 in Oslo) was a Norwegian jazz musician (saxophone), the younger brother of the jazz journalist Johannes (Johs.) Bergh (1932–2001). He was married to jazz singer Laila Dalseth.

Career 
Bergh began to play clarinet, and picked up the saxophone in 1952. In 1956, he became a professional musician. He was a regular member of Kjell Karlsen Sextet for three years, in addition to collaborating sporadically with Rowland Greenberg and other musicians on the Norwegian jazz scene as it once provisioned live dance music of good brand. He also made trips on the Norwegian America Ships with the ships' house orchestra on the voyage to New York. Bergh had mustered the America boat in 1960 and succeeded Harald Bergersen as tenor saxophonist in the Kjell Karlsen new big band. In the summer of 1961, the big band's new singer was Laila Dalseth, his wife to be. He also was in the lineup for the bands of Einar Schanke (1955–56), Rowland Greenberg (1960–64, 1974–81), and Per Borthen (1966–). In addition, he played in his wife Laila Dalseth's orchestra. Later, he played tenor saxophone and soprano saxophone with 'Christiania Jazzband' (from 1990) and with 'Christiania 12' (from 1992).

He released several albums, and his music is reminiscent of the world-renowned tenorists Lester Young and Dexter Gordon.

Honors 
1994: Gammleng-prisen
1995: The city of Oslo cultural scholarship
1997: The Ella-prisen at Kongsberg Jazzfestival
1999: Buddyprisen

Discography 
1986: Tenor madness (Gemini Records), with Al Cohn
1988: I hear a rhapsody, with Per Husby/Egil Kapstad (piano), Ole Jacob Hansen /Egil Johansen (musician) (1934–1998) (drums) & Terje Venaas (bass)
1991: Major blues, within his own quintet recorded at Oslo Jazzfestival, including George Masso (trombone), Major Holley (bass), Egil Kapstad (piano) & Pelle Hultén (drums)
1993: On the trail, with Plas Johnson
1995: Remember  
1996: Warm Valley
1998: Night Bird, with Harry Allen & George Masso
2012: Totti's Choice (Gemini Records), Compilations released posthumously

References

External links 
Laila & Totti 145 år by Bjørn Stendahl at JazzNytt (in Norwegian)

1935 births
2012 deaths
Norwegian jazz saxophonists
Norwegian jazz clarinetists
Norwegian jazz composers
Gemini Records artists
Musicians from Oslo
20th-century saxophonists